Höörs HK H 65 is a Swedish women's handball club from Höör established in 1965, competing in the Swedish women's handball league, Svensk handbollselit (SHE), since 2011.

In 2014 the team won the 2013–14 EHF Challenge Cup.

History 

In 2011-2012, the team accessed to the Elitserien, the highest level in Sweden. In 2012-2013, the team takes part to the playoffs, eliminated by IK Sävehof in semifinals. They also reach the semifinals in the 2012–13 EHF Challenge Cup, beaten by Croatian team, ZRK Fantasyland Samobor.
In 2013-2014, they won their first European title, the 2013–14 EHF Challenge Cup, defeating Issy-Paris Hand.

This season, they reach the final of the 2016–17 EHF Challenge Cup, playing against another Croatian team, HC Lokomotiva Zagreb.

During the 2016-2017 season, the club won the Swedish national women's team handball championship, defeating IK Sävehof, 27-25 in the final game.

Sports Hall information

Name: – Björkvikshallen
City: – Höör
Capacity: – 600
Address: – Friluftsvägen 11, 243 30 Höör, Swedish

Kits

Titles 
Svensk handbollselit:
Winner: 2017
Runner-Up: 2018, 2021
EHF Challenge Cup:
Winners: 2014
Runner-Up: 2017
1/2 Finalist: 2013
Swedish Handball Cup:
Runner-Up: 2023

European record

Team

Current squad 
Squad for the 2022–23 season

Goalkeepers
 1  Josefine Hultberg Dahlgren	
 12  Jannike Wiberg
 16  Gry Bergdahl
 64  Leila Melcher
Wingers
LW
 9  Elsa Åberg
 18  Emely Persson
RW
 4  Vera Gidebratt
 5  Johanna Östblom
 24  Ida Gullberg
Line players
 3  Alma Skretting
 6  Filippa Nyman
 25  Mikaela Fransson

Back players
LB
 13  Tilda Wiberg
 19  Binto Linnér
 27  Cassandra Tollbring
CB
 2  Emma Jönsson
 10  Isabelle Andersson
 21  Moa Heiman
 22  Emma Nuhanovic
RB
 6  Victoria Larsson
 7  Linnea Pripp
 14  Malin Sandberg

Transfers
Transfers for the 2023-24 season.

Joining

Leaving
 Malin Sandberg (RB) (to  ESBF Besançon)

Former club members

Notable former players

  Catherine Kent (2004–2007)
  Mia Rej (2011–2014)
  Sofia Hvenfelt (2016–2020)
  Emma Lindqvist (2016–2021)
  Mikaela Mässing (2014–2019)
  Cassandra Tollbring (2014–2017)
  Jessica Ryde (2013–2017)
  Marie Wall (2013–2018)
  Kristin Thorleifsdóttir (2017–2020)

External links

References

Swedish handball clubs
1965 establishments in Sweden
Handball clubs established in 1965